Gambierdiscus australes is a species of toxic (ciguatoxin- and maitotoxin-like toxicity) dinoflagellate. It is 76–93 μm long and 65–85 μm wide dorsoventrally and its surface is smooth. It is identified by a broad ellipsoid apical pore plate surrounded by 31 round pores. Its first plate occupies 30% of the width of the hypotheca.

References

Further reading

External links
AlgaeBase

Gonyaulacales
Species described in 1999